The 2019 GT & Prototype Challenge was the third series of the GT & Prototype Challenge. The GT and Superlights classes of the Supercar Challenge were split from the original series to form the new championship.

Regulations
The series entrants are divided over four classes. The GT class, from the Supercar Challenge Super GT class, forms the highest and fastest division. Cars with a 2,8 kg per HP or more ratio are allowed to compete. This includes all Group GT3 class cars and specially built GT's such as the Solution F built Volvo S60 and Renault Sport R.S. 01. LMP3 spec cars first raced in the Supercar Challenge Super GT class in 2016. The class forms a separate class within the series open to all 2016 specification LMP3 machinery.

Two classes from the Supercar Challenge Superlights class are included in the new series. The fastest of the two is the Group CN class. Group CN specification cars built after 2014 are allowed to compete. The fourth, and slowest, class is the Radical SR3 class. Mainly a Radical SR3 spec class, the class is open to cars with comparable lap times. Also allowed are the Praga R1 and pre-2014 Group CN class cars.

Calendar

Entry list
There were no Super GT entries.